Marguerite Gabrielle Lemonnier (née Clark; 15 May 1905 – 12 June 1988) was a British-born French singer and film actress. Lemonnier played the female lead in the comedy George and Georgette (1933).

Selected filmography
 My Childish Father (1930)
 A Star Disappears (1932)
 Transit Camp (1932)
 Students in Paris (1932)
 He Is Charming (1932)
 George and Georgette (1933)
 A Weak Woman (1933)
 The Green Jacket (1937)
 Chaste Susanne (1937)
 La chaste Suzanne (1937)
 Beautiful Star (1938)
 Bolero (1942)
 Love Around the Clock (1943)
 Maxime (1958)

References

Bibliography
 Prawer, S.S. Between Two Worlds: The Jewish Presence in German and Austrian Film, 1910–1933. Berghahn Books, 2007.

External links

1905 births
1988 deaths
English film actresses
French film actresses
Actresses from London
Singers from London
20th-century English actresses
20th-century French actresses
20th-century French women singers
20th-century English women singers
20th-century English singers
British emigrants to France